Graham School is a comprehensive school in North Yorkshire, England

Graham School may also refer to:
 Graham School of Continuing Liberal and Professional Studies, a school of the University of Chicago, United States
 The Graham School, a charter high school (grades 9-12) in Columbus, Ohio, United States
 The Graham School (Graham Windham), a residential school and treatment center in Hastings-on-Hudson, New York, United States